C. acaulis may refer to:

Carex acaulis, a sedge
Carlina acaulis, a thistle
Cryptanthus acaulis, a bromeliad
Cymopterus acaulis, an umbellifer